Beauty & the Beast is an American television drama which premiered on October 11, 2012 and concluded on September 15, 2016, on The CW. The series was developed by Sherri Cooper-Landsman and Jennifer Levin, and is very loosely inspired by the 1987 CBS television series of the same name.

A total of 70 episodes of Beauty & the Beast aired over the course of four seasons.

Series overview

Episodes

Season 1 (2012–13)

Season 2 (2013–14)

Season 3 (2015)

Season 4 (2016)

Ratings

References

External links 
 
 

Episodes
Lists of American crime drama television series episodes